Bagdad was a settlement and railroad stop located in northern Forest County, Wisconsin, United States.

Bagdad was located to the southeast of Newald and west of Laona Junction, in what is now the town of Caswell. Bagdad was located on the Minneapolis, St. Paul and Sault Ste. Marie Railroad and was mentioned in a court case between the railroad and the Railroad Commission of Wisconsin in 1914.

References

Ghost towns in Wisconsin
Populated places in Forest County, Wisconsin